The Patna massacre of 1763 was the killing of 45 members of the East India Company, mainly English, on 6 October 1763, in Patna, India, on the order of Nawab Mir Qasim. These men had been imprisoned by Mir Qasim since William Ellis' failed attempt to seize Patna for the East India Company on 25 June and in its aftermath. Following Mir Qasim's defeat, a pillar was erected over the site of the well into which their bodies were thrown and over the houses where the massacre was committed, but nowadays a hospital stands over where the monument was

200 sepoys, previously in the pay of the East India Company, and also imprisoned after the failed seizure of Patna and its aftermath, were also killed for refusing to join the ranks of Mir Qasim, though they are not traditionally included in the massacre narrative. Doctor William Fullerton, a Scottish surgeon in the East India Company, survived the Patna Massacre due to the intercession of Ghulam Hussain Khan, and may have been the only survivor of the massacre

References

Further reading 
 Fullerton's letters, William Fullerton, National Archives
 Firminger, Walter K. (1870-1940); Anderson, William (d. 1763); Campbell, Peter (d. 1763); Fullarton, William, The Diaries of Three Surgeons of Patna, 1763,  Calcutta : Calcutta Historical Society (1909)

Massacres in India
1763 in India